The Old Army Game is a 1943 World War II cartoon starring Donald Duck that was produced by Walt Disney and distributed by RKO Radio Pictures.

Plot
Pete is inspecting a camp and goes through the cabins to see all of the soldiers sleeping. He hears repeated snoring from one cabin, so he checks it, only to see a record and dummies in the beds. Speaking of which, Donald Duck sneakingly arrives at the Army Camp, after some unauthorized leave.

Knowing Donald's coming, Pete hides under the bed to surprise him. Donald Duck goes to his bed, and sleeps in it, knowing that he "put it over on the sarge", not realizing that Black Pete is in. But when he does, Donald runs for it. Pete chases Donald and Donald hides under one of three boxes, Donald switches the boxes repeatedly to fool Pete. But when Pete nearly finds him, and fails because Donald is clinging to the inside of the box, he kicks Donald's box which flies through the bladed fence and cracks in half. Donald's lower half falls in a hole, which causes him to think that his lower half has been cut off, and when Pete comes, he believes the same thing and begins to cry over Donald's tragedy. Donald feels so upset, he grabs Pete's gun and attempts suicide. But Pete tells him to do it "Over there, behind the bushes", to which Donald comes out of the hole realizing that his lower half hasn't been cut off. Donald feels relieved, but Pete on the other hand feels angry. So Pete chases Donald to a sign which says National Speed Limit: 35 mi, so Donald and Black Pete chase more slowly (and even the music slows down) as the cartoon ends with a fade to black.

Voice cast
 Donald Duck: Clarence Nash
 Pete: Billy Bletcher

Home media
The short was released on May 18, 2004, on Walt Disney Treasures: Walt Disney on the Front Lines and on December 6, 2005, on Walt Disney Treasures: The Chronological Donald, Volume Two: 1942-1946.

References

External links

1940s Disney animated short films
Donald Duck short films
1943 films
1943 animated films
1943 short films
Films about suicide
Films directed by Jack King
Films produced by Walt Disney
World War II films made in wartime
Films scored by Paul Smith (film and television composer)
Films with screenplays by Carl Barks